XHEJU-FM is a community radio station on 95.3 FM in Ejutla de Crespo, Oaxaca. It is known as La Ejuteca Radio and owned by the civil association Colectivo Oaxaqueño para la Difusión de la Cultura y las Artes, A.C.

History
XHEJU began broadcasting in 2010 as a pirate on 98.1 MHz. The station received its concession in December 2016 and in March 2018, 15 months later, finally moved to its newly assigned frequency of 95.3.

References

Radio stations in Oaxaca
Community radio stations in Mexico
Former pirate radio stations
Radio stations established in 2010